The following are the Pulitzer Prizes for 1927.

Journalism awards
Public Service:
Canton Daily News, for its brave, patriotic and effective fight for the ending of a vicious state of affairs brought about by collusion between city authorities and the criminal element, a fight which had a tragic result in the assassination of the editor of the paper, Mr. Don R. Mellett.
Reporting:
John T. Rogers of the St. Louis Post-Dispatch, for the inquiry leading to the impeachment of Judge George W. English of the U.S. Court for the Eastern District of Illinois.
Editorial Writing:
F. Lauriston Bullard of the Boston Herald, for "We Submit".

Editorial Cartooning:
Nelson Harding of the Brooklyn Daily Eagle, for "Toppling the Idol".

Letters and Drama Awards
Novel:
Early Autumn by Louis Bromfield (Stokes)
Drama:
In Abraham's Bosom by Paul Green (McBride)
History:
Pinckney's Treaty by Samuel Flagg Bemis (Johns Hopkins)
Biography or Autobiography:
Whitman by Emory Holloway (Knopf)
Poetry:
Fiddler's Farewell by Leonora Speyer (Knopf)

References

External links
Pulitzer Prizes for 1927

Pulitzer Prizes by year
Pulitzer Prize
Pulitzer Prize